Jamie Redman (born July 19, 1986 in Spokane, Washington) is an American rower.

References 

 

1986 births
Living people
American female rowers
Sportspeople from Spokane, Washington
World Rowing Championships medalists for the United States
21st-century American women